Diwan Bahadur Sir Satappa Ramanatha Muttaiya Annamalai Chettiar, Raja of Chettinad KCSI (30 September 1881 – 15 June 1948) was an Indian industrialist, banker, educationist and philanthropist from Tamil Nadu. He is the founder of Annamalai University in Chidambaram and one of the founders of Indian Bank, along with his brother S. Rm. M. Ramaswami Chettiar.

Born to S. Rm. Muthiah Chettiar of a wealthy Nagarathar family, Annamalai Chettiar joined the family business early and expanded their banking operations to South-East Asia. Annamalai Chettiar was one of the founders of Indian Bank along with his brother S. Rm. M. Ramaswami Chettiar and served as the first governor of the Imperial Bank of India. He also served a term as a member of the Council of State, the upper house of the Imperial Legislative Council of India and was honoured with a knighthood in 1923 and the hereditary title of Raja of Chettinad in 1929.

Early life

Annamalai Chettiar was born on 30 September 1881 at Kanadukathan in the Sivaganga estate of the then Madura district in the Madras Presidency of British India. His father, S.R. Muthiah Chettiar was a noted banker. His brother Ramaswami Chettiar was one of the founders of the Indian Bank of which Annamalai Chettiar later served as a director. After his schooling, he joined his family business and spent a considerable time in England. On his return home, he became the head of the civic body of Karaikudi and the District Board.

Career

In 1916, he transferred from local affairs to the Legislative Council of Madras Presidency, where he sat for 3 years. In 1920, he stood for election to the Council of State and held his seat in the council for three consecutive terms. He was appointed one of the governors of the Imperial Bank of India in 1921. Annamalai Chettiar established Sri Meenakshi College at Chidambaram in 1920. A Tamil College was added in 1927 and an Oriental Training College and College of Music were established. All these institutions were combined to form the Annamalai University on 1 January 1929. He died on 15 June 1948.

Honours

Chettiar was given the title Diwan Bahadur by King George V for valuable services rendered to the Crown. Later, he was conferred the honour of knighthood on 2 June 1923. In 1929, he was conferred the title of hereditary Raja of Chettinad.

Family and legacy

Annamalai Chettiar's oldest son M. A. Muthiah Chettiar, an activist of the Tamil Isai Movement, served as the Minister of Education and excise in the Madras Presidency while his third son M. A. Chidambaram and grandson A. C. Muthiah both served as presidents of the Board of Control for Cricket in India (BCCI). Annamalai Chettiar is the maternal grandfather of former Finance Minister of India  P. Chidambaram.

The suburb of Raja Annamalaipuram in Chennai is named after Annamalai Chettiar. Indian Posts and Telegraphs Department issued a commemorative stamp in his honor.

References

1881 births
1948 deaths
Knights Commander of the Order of the Star of India
Indian Knights Bachelor
Indian monarchs
Founders of Indian schools and colleges
Indian bankers
Businesspeople from Chennai
Mayors of Chennai
Annamalai University
20th-century Indian philanthropists
Members of the Council of State (India)
Businesspeople in British India